Miss Congeniality is a 2000 American action comedy film directed by Donald Petrie, written by Marc Lawrence, Katie Ford and Caryn Lucas, and produced by and starring Sandra Bullock as Gracie Hart, a tomboy agent who is asked by the FBI to go undercover as a contestant when a terrorist threatens to bomb the Miss United States pageant. Michael Caine, Benjamin Bratt, Candice Bergen, William Shatner, and Ernie Hudson star in supporting roles.

Miss Congeniality was released by Warner Bros. Pictures on December 22, 2000. The film was a box office hit, grossing $212 million worldwide against its $45 million budget, and earned Bullock a nomination for a Golden Globe Award for Best Actress – Motion Picture Comedy or Musical. It was followed by the sequel Miss Congeniality 2: Armed and Fabulous in 2005.

Plot
In 1982, a young Gracie Hart steps into a playground fight to beat up a bully who is threatening a boy she likes. However, the boy feels humiliated at being rescued by a girl and rejects her rudely. In response, Gracie punches him in the nose and leaves to sulk alone.

Years later, Gracie is now a tough special agent for the FBI. During a sting operation against Russian mobsters, she disobeys her superior's orders in order to save a mob boss who appears to be choking, which causes one of the other agents to be shot. Gracie is demoted to a desk job as punishment. Soon after, the agency is alerted via a letter from the notorious domestic terrorist known only as "the Citizen" to a bomb threat at the upcoming 75th annual Miss United States beauty pageant in San Antonio, Texas. Gracie's partner Eric Matthews is put in charge, and he relies on Gracie's suggestions, only to take credit for them himself. One of Gracie's ideas is to plant an agent undercover at the event and reach the top five so they have access to everything in the pageant. When all possible candidates are deemed unfit, Eric suggests that Gracie take on that role, replacing Miss New Jersey, who was to be disqualified.

Beauty pageant coach Victor Melling teaches Gracie how to dress, walk and behave like a contestant. Although she was initially appalled, Gracie comes to appreciate Victor's thoroughness. Gracie enters the pageant as "Gracie Lou Freebush", representing New Jersey, and becomes friends with Cheryl Frasier, who is Miss Rhode Island. As the competition begins, Gracie impresses the judges during the talent competition with her glass harp skills and self-defense techniques.

Several suspects are identified, including the current competition director and former pageant winner Kathy Morningside, her assistant Frank Tobin, the veteran MC Stan Fields, and Cheryl, who has a history of being a radical animal rights activist. Gracie accompanies Cheryl and other contestants as they spend a night partying, where Gracie tries to dig into Cheryl's past, but inadvertently learns from the others that Kathy's past as a pageant contestant is suspect, including the fact that she won after the leading contestant suddenly came down with food poisoning. Gracie comes to believe Kathy is a "Citizen" copycat. When Gracie reports this to Eric and the team, she learns that "The Citizen" has been arrested on an unrelated charge, and because there is no further threat, their supervisor has pulled the mission. Gracie insists that she suspects something is wrong, but Eric and the team leave, unconvinced. While on their way home, Victor informs Eric that Frank is actually Kathy's son, a fact they'd tried to hide from the FBI. Eric returns to Texas to help her continue the investigation against orders.

In the final round, Gracie is stunned when she is named first runner-up. Cheryl is named Miss United States, but as she goes to accept the tiara, Gracie realizes that Frank impersonated "the Citizen" to make the pageant bomb threat, and that the bomb is in the crown. Gracie fights the other contestants for the crown as Eric wrestles with Frank, who is about to detonate the bomb. Gracie throws the tiara up at the stage scenery, where it explodes and sets the stage on fire. As Kathy and Frank are arrested, Gracie determines that the two wanted to kill the pageant winner on stage as revenge for Kathy's termination from the Miss United States organization. Afterwards, Eric asks Gracie out on a date and they kiss. Soon after, Eric and Victor trick Gracie into attending the pageant's farewell breakfast where the new Miss United States (Cheryl) names Gracie "Miss Congeniality".

Cast
 Sandra Bullock as FBI Special Agent Gracie Hart
 Mary Ashleigh Green as young Gracie
 Michael Caine as Victor Melling
 Benjamin Bratt as FBI Agent Eric Matthews
 Candice Bergen as Kathy Morningside
 William Shatner as Stanley Fields
 Heather Burns as Cheryl Frasier (Miss Rhode Island)
 Deirdre Quinn as Mary Jo Wright (Miss Texas)
 Wendy Raquel Robinson as Leslie Davis (Miss California)
 Melissa De Sousa as Karen Krantz (Miss New York)
 Asia De Marcos as Alana Krewson (Miss Hawaii)
 Steve Monroe as Frank Tobin
 Ernie Hudson as FBI Assistant Director Harry McDonald
 John DiResta as Agent Clonsky

Production

Development
Ellen DeGeneres claims that the writer was inspired when watching her training to walk in high heels and a dress in preparation for the Emmys.

Casting

8 actors read for the part of Eric Matthews, including Hugh Jackman. Matt Dillon came close getting cast as Eric Matthews, but the part went to Benjamin Bratt.

Filming
The story is set in New York City and San Antonio. Scenes showing the exterior of the St. Regis New York, as well as a few street scenes, were shot on location in New York, and Weehawken, New Jersey. The Alamo and River Walk scenes were shot on location in San Antonio. The majority of the film was shot in Austin, Texas: scenes depicting the interior of the St. Regis were shot in Austin's Driskill Hotel; the pageant scenes were shot at the Bass Concert Hall at the University of Texas at Austin; and scenes depicting the pageant contestants in their hotel rooms were shot in the Omni Austin at South Park.

Distribution 
Miss Congeniality was distributed by Warner Bros. Pictures in most countries, and by Roadshow Entertainment in Australia and New Zealand.

Reception

Box office
The film was the fifth highest-grossing film in North America on its opening weekend, making US$13.9 million. It had a 5% increase in earnings the following week—enough to make the film reach #3. Overall, it was a box office hit, grossing more than $106 million in the United States, and more than $212 million worldwide.

Critical response
On Rotten Tomatoes the film has an approval rating of 41% based on review from 116 critics. The critical consensus reads: "Though critics say Bullock is funny and charming, she can't overcome a bad script that makes the movie feel too much like a fluffy, unoriginal sitcom." On Metacritic the film has a score of 43 out of 100, based on reviews from 20 critics, indicating "mixed or average reviews". Audiences surveyed by CinemaScore gave the film a grade of "A−".

A. O. Scott of The New York Times described it as "a standard-issue fish-out-of-water comedy" which "seems happily, deliberately second-rate, as if its ideal audience consisted of weary airline passengers". Roger Ebert for the Chicago Sun-Times wrote: "It isn't bad so much as it lacks any ambition to be more than it so obviously is" although he had some praise for Sandra Bullock's performance.

It was nominated for several awards, including two Golden Globes: Sandra Bullock earned a nod for Best Performance by an Actress in a Motion Picture – Comedy/Musical, and Bosson's "One in a Million" was nominated for Best Original Song in a Motion Picture.

Home media
The film's first DVD edition, released in 2001, included two audio commentaries, some deleted scenes, the theatrical trailer, and two documentaries about the making of the film. A deluxe-edition DVD, released in 2005, featured different cover art and contained the same features as the other DVD version plus a quiz hosted by William Shatner and a sneak peek at the upcoming sequel. In 2009, a double feature edition was released that included the sequel.

Sequel
A sequel, Miss Congeniality 2: Armed and Fabulous, was released on March 24, 2005. The film starred Sandra Bullock, Regina King, Enrique Murciano, William Shatner, Ernie Hudson, Heather Burns, Diedrich Bader, and Treat Williams. The sequel was less successful both critically and commercially, earning only $101.3 million.

Soundtrack

 "One in a Million" - Bosson (3:30)
 "If Everybody Looked the Same" - Groove Armada (3:40)
 "She's a Lady (The BT Remix)" - Tom Jones (4:21)
 "Anywhere USA" - P.Y.T. (4:06)
 "Dancing Queen" - A-Teens (3:50)
 "Let's Get It On" - Red Venom (3:26)
 "Get Ya Party On" - Baha Men (3:20)
 "None of Your Business" - Salt 'N' Pepa (3:34)
 "Mustang Sally" - The Commitments (4:59)
 "Bullets" - Bob Schneider (4:25)
 "Liquored Up and Lacquered Down" - Southern Culture on the Skids (2:26)
 "Miss United States (Berman Brothers Mix)" - William Shatner (3:38)
 "One in a Million (Bostrom Mix)" - Bosson (3:33)

References

External links

 
 
 
 

2000 films
2000 action comedy films
2000 comedy films
2000s police comedy films
American action comedy films
Films about beauty pageants
Castle Rock Entertainment films
2000s English-language films
Films about the Federal Bureau of Investigation
Films about women in the United States
Films directed by Donald Petrie
Films produced by Sandra Bullock
Films scored by Edward Shearmur
Films set in San Antonio
Films shot in New Jersey
Films shot in San Antonio
Films shot in Texas
Films set in 1982
Films with screenplays by Marc Lawrence
Village Roadshow Pictures films
Warner Bros. films
2000s American films